Potassium channel blockers are agents which interfere with conduction through potassium channels.

Medical uses

Arrhythmia 

Potassium channel blockers used in the treatment of cardiac arrhythmia are classified as class III antiarrhythmic agents.

Mechanism
Class III agents predominantly block the potassium channels, thereby prolonging repolarization. More specifically, their primary effect is on IKr.

Since these agents do not affect the sodium channel, conduction velocity is not decreased.  The prolongation of the action potential duration and refractory period, combined with the maintenance of normal conduction velocity, prevent re-entrant arrhythmias. (The re-entrant rhythm is less likely to interact with tissue that has become refractory).

Examples and uses

Amiodarone is indicated for the treatment of refractory VT or VF, particularly in the setting of acute ischemia.  Amiodarone is also safe to use in individuals with cardiomyopathy and atrial fibrillation, to maintain normal sinus rhythm. Amiodarone prolongation of the action potential is uniform over a wide range of heart rates, so this drug does not have reverse use-dependent action.  Amiodarone was the first agent described in this class.   Amiodarone should only be used to treat adults with life-threatening ventricular arrhythmias when other treatments are ineffective or have not been tolerated.
 Dofetilide blocks only the rapid K channels; this means that at higher heart rates, when there is increased involvement of the slow K channels, dofetilide has less of an action potential-prolonging effect.
 Sotalol is indicated for the treatment of atrial or ventricular tachyarrhythmias, and AV re-entrant arrhythmias.
 Ibutilide is the only antiarrhythmic agent currently approved by the Food and Drug Administration for acute conversion of atrial fibrillation to sinus rhythm.
 Azimilide
 Bretylium
 Clofilium
 E-4031
 Nifekalant
 Tedisamil
 Sematilide

Side effects
These agents include a risk of torsades de pointes.

Anti-diabetics
Sulfonylureas, such as gliclazide, are ATP-sensitive potassium channel blockers.

Other uses
Dalfampridine, A potassium channel blocker has also been approved for use in the treatment of multiple sclerosis.

Reverse use dependence 
Potassium channel blockers exhibit reverse use-dependent prolongation of the action potential duration. Reverse use dependence is the effect where the efficacy of the drug is reduced after repeated use of the tissue. This contrasts with (ordinary) use dependence, where the efficacy of the drug is increased after repeated use of the tissue.

Reverse use dependence is relevant for potassium channel blockers used as class III antiarrhythmics. Reverse use dependent drugs that slow heart rate (such as quinidine) can be less effective at high heart rates. The refractoriness of the ventricular myocyte increases at lower heart rates.  This increases the susceptibility of the myocardium to early Afterdepolarizations (EADs) at low heart rates. Antiarrhythmic agents that exhibit reverse use-dependence (such as quinidine) are more efficacious at preventing a tachyarrhythmia than converting someone into normal sinus rhythm. Because of the reverse use-dependence of class III agents, at low heart rates class III antiarrhythmic agents may paradoxically be more arrhythmogenic.

Drugs such as quinidine may be both reverse use dependent and use dependent.

Calcium-activated potassium channel blockers 
Examples of calcium-activated potassium channel blockers include:

Charybdotoxin
 Iberiotoxin
Apamin

Kaliotoxin,

Lolitrem,

 BKCa-specific
 GAL-021
 Ethanol (alcohol)

Inwardly rectifying channel blockers 
Examples of inwardly rectifying channel blockers include:

ROMK (Kir1.1) 
Nonselective: Ba2+, Cs+

GPCR regulated (Kir3.x) 

GPCR antagonists
Ifenprodil
Caramiphen 
Cloperastine
Clozapine 
Dextromethorphan 
Ethosuximide 
Tertiapin
Tipepidine
Ba2+

ATP-sensitive (Kir6.x) 

Meglitinides (Non-Sulfonylureas)
Mitiglinide
Nateglinide
Repaglinide
Sulfonylureas
Acetohexamide 
Carbutamide 
Chlorpropamide 
Glycyclamide
Metahexamide
Sulfonylureas (continued)
Tolazamide
Tolbutamide
Glibornuride 
Glisoxepide
Glyclopyramide
Gliclazide
Glibenclamide (glyburide)
Glipizide 
Glimepiride 
Glicaramide

Tandem pore domain channel blockers 
Examples of tandem pore domain channel blockers include:

Bupivacaine
Quinidine
Fluoxetine
Seproxetine (Norfluoxetine)
 12-O-tetradecanoylphorbol-13-acetate (TPA) (phorbol 12-myristate 13-acetate).

Voltage-gated channel blockers 

Examples of voltage-gated channel blockers include:

Some types of dendrotoxins
3,4-Diaminopyridine (amifampridine)
4-Aminopyridine (fampridine/dalfampridine)
Adekalant
Almokalant
Amiodarone
Azimilide
Bretylium
Bunaftine
Charybdotoxin
Clamikalant
Conotoxins, such as κ-conotoxin,
Dalazatide
Dofetilide
Dronedarone,'''
E-4031
 Guangxitoxin
Hanatoxin
HgeTx1
HsTx1

Ibutilide,
Inakalant
Kaliotoxin
Linopirdine
Lolitrem B
Maurotoxin
Nifekalant
Notoxin
Paxilline
Pinokalant

Quinidine
ShK-186
Sotalol
Tedisamil
Terikalant
Tetraethylammonium
 Verapamil,
Vernakalant

hERG (KCNH2, Kv11.1)-specific 

Ajmaline
Amiodarone
AmmTX3
Astemizole
Azaspiracid
AZD1305
Azimilide
Bedaquiline
BeKm-1
BmTx3
BRL-32872
Chlorpromazine
Cisapride
Clarithromycin
Darifenacin
Dextropropoxyphene
Diallyl trisulfide
Domperidone
E-4031
Ergtoxins
Erythromycin
Gigactonine
Haloperidol
Ketoconazole
Norpropoxyphene
Orphenadrine
Pimozide
PNU-282,987
Promethazine
Quinidine
Ranolazine
Roxithromycin
Sertindole
Solifenacin
Tamulotoxin
Terodiline
Terfenadine
Thioridazine
Tolterodine
Vanoxerine
Vernakalant

KCNQ (Kv7)-specific 

 Linopirdine
XE-991
Spooky toxin (SsTx)

See also
 Potassium channel
 Potassium channel opener

Notes

References